Endophthora is a genus of moths belonging to the family Tineidae. This genus is endemic to New Zealand.

Species
Endophthora omogramma Meyrick, 1888
Endophthora pallacopis Meyrick, 1918
Endophthora rubiginella Hudson, 1939
Endophthora tylogramma Meyrick, 1924

References

Tineidae
Endemic fauna of New Zealand
Taxa named by Edward Meyrick
Tineidae genera
Endemic moths of New Zealand